Excentris was a performing arts center and cinema located on Saint-Laurent Boulevard in Montreal, Quebec. The complex was conceived by Daniel Langlois as a laboratory for digital media production as well as a screening venue. It was opened in June 1999, after two years of construction at a cost of CA$6.2 million, and covered .

Excentris ran into financial difficulty in 2009 and was forced to shut down two of its three cinemas. It was revived as a three-screen complex in 2011, with the help of a $4 million loan from Quebec provincial film funding agency SODEC, $2.75 million from the City of Montreal, and $1 million from the Daniel Langlois Foundation.

The centre closed its doors in November 2015, citing financial difficulties. Cinéma Parallèle, the non-profit organization that ran the center, entered bankruptcy protection in May 2015.

References

External links
 Excentris website

Performing arts centres in Canada
Music venues in Montreal
Theatres in Montreal
Event venues established in 2009
Le Plateau-Mont-Royal